Murray Stanley Hoffman  (April 15, 1924 – March 23, 2018) was an American cardiologist, educator and diplomate of the American Board of Internal Medicine and the American Board of Cardiovascular Disease, a Fellow of the American College of Cardiology and a member of the Council on Clinical Cardiology (CLCD) of the American Heart Association.

Career

Hoffman trained as a cardiologist at the Mayo Clinic, at the time that Earl Wood and colleagues were perfecting heart catheterization and investigating the means of cardiac bypass to allow for open heart surgery, and these methods were adopted early at the National Jewish Hospital (Denver), with Hoffman as chief of cardiology. Motivated by the ability to now treat congenital heart disease, enabled through the use of the cardiac bypass pump, Hoffman was part of a team of physicians who introduced the use of the single lead electrocardiogram to screen school children. Maintaining his close ties with the Mayo Clinic, Hoffman is a founding member of the Doctors Mayo Society and served as president of the National Mayo Alumni Association from 1977-79. As co-chair of the Colorado Heart Association Preventative Cardiology-Exercise Committee, he (together with his wife, Eleanor, Jerome Biffle, a 1952 Olympic Gold Medalist and Marilyn Van Derbur, 1958 Miss America) introduced one of the earliest jogging programs for heart health, and Hoffman served as the president of the Colorado Heart Association from 1975-76. In addition, Hoffman was a member of the Board of Trustees of the American College of Cardiology. Throughout his career he authored / co-authored 23 publications (listed below) in the field of clinical cardiology.

 1941: Graduated summa cum laude from East High School (Denver)
 1943: Received BA Degree from the University of Denver
 1943-1947: Sponsored by the U.S. Navy, attended University of Colorado School of Medicine on an accelerated 3-year program and graduated 1st in his class
 1947-1949: Served his internship and Medical residency at the University of Cincinnati (Cincinnati, Ohio)
 1949-1951: Served his fellowship in cardiology and Internal medicine at the Mayo Clinic (Rochester, Minnesota)
 1951:  Certified by the American Board of Internal Medicine and the Sub-specialty Board of Cardiology
 1951-1953: Served in the United States Public Health Service (during Korean War)
 1954: Received the degree of Master of Science in Medicine from the University of Minnesota (affiliated, at the time, with the Mayo Clinic)
 1953-1990: Maintained a private practice of cardiology (Denver, Colorado)
 1955-1968: Chief of Cardiology, National Jewish Hospital (half time position);  member of the National Jewish Hospital's open heart surgery program (Denver, Colorado)
 1975-1976: President, Colorado Heart Association
 1975-1979: Trustee of the American College of Cardiology
 1977-1979: President, National Mayo Clinic Alumni Association
 1985: American College of Cardiology manpower advisory committee
 1990-2002: Closed private practice and joined the faculty of the University of Colorado School of Medicine where he was rapidly promoted to Professor of Medicine and Cardiology (Denver, Colorado)
 2002: Retired
 2018: Died in Denver, Colorado at Rose Medical Center March 23

Publications 
 
 
 
 
 
 
 
 
 
 
 
 
 
 
 
 
 
 
 
 
 
 
 *

References 

1924 births
2018 deaths
American cardiologists
Physicians from Colorado
University of Denver alumni
Fellows of the American College of Cardiology
University of Colorado alumni
University of Minnesota alumni